Eefje Boons (born 18 July 1994) is a Dutch hurdler. She competed in the women's 100 metres hurdles at the 2017 World Championships in Athletics.

Her personal bests are 12.86 seconds in the 100 metres hurdles (+1.7 m/s, Guadalajara 2018) and 8.10 seconds in the 60 metres hurdles (Athlone 2018).

International competitions

References

External links

 

1994 births
Living people
Dutch female hurdlers
World Athletics Championships athletes for the Netherlands
Sportspeople from Deventer
Dutch Athletics Championships winners
21st-century Dutch women